Edward Turnour, 5th Earl Winterton (15 August 1837 – 5 September 1907) was an Irish peer and cricketer.

He married Lady Georgiana Susan Hamilton (1841–1913), daughter of James Hamilton, 1st Duke of Abercorn, by whom he had one son:
Edward Turnour, 6th Earl Winterton (1883–1962)

He played first-class cricket for Sussex and the Marylebone Cricket Club.

References

External links

Turnour, Edward, 5th Earl Winterton
Winterton, Edward Turnour, 5th Earl
Irish cricketers
Sussex cricketers
Marylebone Cricket Club cricketers
Presidents of the Marylebone Cricket Club
Earls Winterton